Philip Walter Edwards,  (7 February 1923 – 27 November 2015) was a British literary scholar. He was King Alfred Professor of English Literature at the University of Liverpool from 1974 to 1990. He had previously taught at the University of Birmingham, Harvard University, Trinity College Dublin, and the University of Essex.

Selected works

References

1923 births
2015 deaths
British literary critics
Shakespearean scholars
Academics of the University of Liverpool
Academics of the University of Birmingham
Harvard University faculty
Academics of Trinity College Dublin
Fellows of Trinity College Dublin
Fellows of the British Academy